JobSerf, Inc. was an employment service and job search outsourcing (JSO) company. It was founded in 2004 by three Dallas executives: Jay Martin, Phil Miller and David Micek. Jay Martin is a former Strategy and Supply Chain Consultant who worked for Arthur D.Little, IBM and PepsiCo. Phil Miller is a Dallas-based Financial Executive and former CFO.  David Micek has been a CEO of multiple companies, and was also the President of internet leader AltaVista. In 2004, JobSerf was the first company to demonstrate the feasibility of job search outsourcing, and the pioneer in the job search outsourcing industry.

Job Search Outsourcing
JobSerf took the work of searching for and applying to jobs on  employment websites such as Craigslist or CareerBuilder and outsourced these tasks to offshore resources. By doing so, users of the service were able to apply to many more jobs much faster than if they were doing it themselves. This helped them to free up time to go on interviews, keep working their day jobs, or to apply to even more jobs and supplement the service.

In general, the types of service that JSO's provide include general information (e.g. book, articles), customized or tailored advice (e.g. coaching, profile specific information) and tools (e.g. products and services which facilitate easier or more effective job searching by the candidate). Companies like JobSerf take ownership and complete the execution of the task of online job searching. For the first stage  of a job search, a resume writer is a good comparison. The job seeker passes information (or an initial draft) to the writer, and the writer completes the job seeker's resume (and cover letters) versus providing them with advice or tools.

Process
Typically, a job seeker would sign-up on JobSerf's website, and then provide JobSerf with information regarding where to reach them, search focus, past experience and job boards. Users must define their objectives in their job search. Objectives include facets such as geographic area, industries, functional expertise, career level and salary requirements.

After this is completed, users create between 1 to 5 targeted  résumés and  cover letters for each type of position. The company used a ‘fill-in’ concept on the cover letters to provide semi-customization when applying to jobs. The company then created a search algorithm of keywords and websites to conduct deep searches for jobs on the internet. The jobs found were then applied to with the provided cover letters and résumés via the user's email address. The company had multiple redundancy controls to prevent applying to those companies and websites that a user advises them to avoid. This improved efficiency by not wasting time with companies known not to be of interest, while also providing privacy protection for employed job seekers or customers in the interview process with the companies on this list. Given the human element of the process, customers have the ability to tailor and refine their search daily depending on their status.

Email Address Technology
JobSerf used an undisclosed technology that enabled it to send and receive emails from users' email addresses without gaining access to their personal information. This enabled the company to apply to jobs while having it appear that the jobseeker did it him/herself. When the recipient saw the email, it showed the customer's name. In addition, when they replied, the customer received the email and not JobSerf.

References

External links
 JobSerf's Website
 About.com Article 
 Everyjoe Article
Attack of the Show Interview
Jobradio.com Review and Interview
CNET Article
Recruiter's Lounge Review
Ere.net Review

Companies based in Dallas